The Online Learning Consortium (OLC) is a collaborative community of higher education leaders and innovators, dedicated to advancing quality digital teaching and learning experiences designed to reach and engage the modern learner – anyone, anywhere, anytime. OLC inspires innovation and quality through an extensive set of resources including, best practice publications, quality benchmarking, leading-edge instruction, community-driven conferences, practitioners based and empirical research, and expert guidance. The growing OLC community includes faculty members, administrators, trainers, instructional designers, other learning professionals, educational institutions, professional societies, and corporate enterprises.

The Online Learning Consortium, Inc. is a 501(C)(3) nonprofit organization.

The Online Learning Consortium (OLC) helps leto lelearningarnarning organizations continually improve the quality, scale, and breadth of their online programs according to their distinctive missions, so that education will become a part of everyday life, accessible and affordable for anyone, anywhere, at any time, in a wide variety of disciplines. OLC supports the collaborative sharing of knowledge and effective practices to improve online education in learning effectiveness, access, affordability for learners and providers, and student and faculty satisfaction.

OLC hosts conferences, workshops, and programs to help implement and improve online programs; publishes the Online Learning journal (formerly the Journal of Asynchronous Learning Networks, JALN), and conducts research, annual surveys on online and digital learning and forums to inform academic, government and private sector audiences. OLC offers the OLC Awards for Excellence in Online Teaching, Research & Leadership, and the annual effective practice awards.

OLC generates ideas to improve products, services, and standards for the online learning industry and assists members in collaborative initiatives. Members include:
 private and public universities and colleges, community colleges and other accredited course and degree providers, and
 organizations and suppliers of services, equipment, and tools that practice the OLC quality principles.

References

External links
 

Non-profit organizations based in the United States